The Kodiak Daily Mirror is the daily newspaper of Kodiak, Alaska, established June 15, 1940. It was purchased by the Fairbanks Daily News-Miner in 1998. In 2016 the Fairbanks Daily-News-Miner, and with it the Kodiak Daily Mirror, were purchased by the nonprofit Helen E. Snedden Foundation.

References

External links
 

1940 establishments in Alaska
Daily newspapers published in the United States
Kodiak Island Borough, Alaska
MediaNews Group publications
Newspapers published in Alaska
Newspapers established in 1940